Chun Jung-bae (born 12 December 1954) is a South Korean politician who was the joint chairman of the People's Party, alongside Ahn Cheol-soo. He is a member of the National Assembly for Seo District in Gwangju since 2015, having previously represented Ansan from 1996 to 2012. He served as Minister of Justice from 2005 to 2006 under President Roh Moo-hyun.

Chun was credited with securing Roh's victory in the 2002 presidential election and, as floor leader of Roh's Uri Party, the party's subsequent majority in the 2004 legislative election. In 2007, Chun defected from the Uri Party to the United New Democratic Party after entering into conflict with other members of the pro-Roh group, including then-presidential chief of staff Moon Jae-in.

After standing unsuccessfully for a seat in Seoul in the 2012 elections for the Democratic United Party, Chun organized the presidential nomination campaign of Kim Doo-kwan as an alternative candidate to Moon, who would become the party's nominee. Continuing to oppose Moon, by that time party leader, he left the DUP's successor the New Politics Alliance for Democracy in March 2015, citing the party's lack of reformist leadership. He ran as an independent that year in a by-election in Gwangju, commonly viewed as a stronghold of the main liberal party, and defeated the NPAD candidate in a shock landslide victory on April 29, returning to the Assembly. In September 2015, a number of NPAD lawmakers in contact with Chun defected from the party, triggering speculation over the formation of a new party; on September 19, Chun publicly announced that he would establish a new party in opposition to the NPAD.

Chun established a new People's Reform Party, and joined forces with Ahn Cheol-soo in January 2016 to form the People's Party. In the lead-up to the 2016 parliamentary elections, however, Chun came into conflict with Ahn in March over the prospect of an electoral alliance with the Minjoo Party of Korea, the NPAD's successor; Chun vowed to boycott party meetings until Ahn withdrew from his opposition to such a pact. He backed down after a private meeting with Ahn on March 15, and the alliance with the Minjoo Party ultimately failed to materialize.

On December 26, 2016, he declared that he will be running for President in 2017 and will face his former co-leader Ahn.

References

1954 births
Living people
People's Party (South Korea, 2016) politicians
Uri Party politicians
Democratic Party (South Korea, 2000) politicians
Justice ministers of South Korea
Members of the National Assembly (South Korea)
People from South Jeolla Province
Yeongyang Cheon clan
Seoul National University School of Law alumni